Don't Forget Your Roots is the sixth studio album by American punk rock band H2O. It was released on Bridge 9 Records in 2011. It is a cover album consisting of covers of punk songs by bands who influenced H2O over the years.

The album peaked at number 13 on Billboard's Top Heatseekers chart in December 2011.

Track listing

Personnel
 Toby Morse – vocals
 Todd Morse – guitar, vocals
 Adam Blake – bass
 Todd Friend – drums
 Rusty Pistachio – guitar, vocals

References

H2O (American band) albums
Bridge 9 Records albums
Covers albums
2011 albums